The Pacific 24 is a rigid inflatable boat made by BAE Systems in the UK, one of a range of small boats made by the company.  it was the latest Pacific craft within the BAE Halmatic range, and has been proven in service with the UK MOD, UK police and overseas military and paramilitary organisations. It was designed to replace the Pacific 22. An uncrewed version of the boat, controlled from a parent Navy ship, has been developed, entering tests in 2020; a few boats may ultimately be deployed for special missions, or a whole fleet ordered.

Usage 
The boats are mostly used for fast rescue, anti-piracy and counter-narcotics missions, and are the standard boats used by Royal Navy and Royal Fleet Auxiliary ships.

They have a "dry running" capability, allowing their engines to be started out of the water, while still attached to a ship's davits.

UK Ministry of Defence 
In December 2015 the MoD placed an order for 60 Pacific 24 boats as part of a £13.5m contract for use with vessels such as the Queen Elizabeth Class aircraft carriers and the new River class offshore patrol vessels. These new boats will include high-performance shock-absorbing seats that minimise crew fatigue, allowing them to travel up to six times the distance.

Building was to start in early 2016, and was expected to take four years to complete.

Operators 
 Ministry of Defence (United Kingdom)
 Royal Navy
 Various UK police services
 Various UK rescue authorities
 Other UK and International Agencies

References

See also
Boats of similar role and configuration:
 Short Range Prosecutor

Equipment of the Royal Navy
BAE Systems